Frits Vilhelm Holm  (c. 1881 – May 1930) was a Danish scholar and adventurer. His books usually gave his name as simply Frits Holm or Frits V. Holm, while US newspapers of the time usually misspelled his name as Fritz von Holm, sometimes  claiming that he was a member of the European nobility.

Holm is best known for his attempt, in 1907, to "obtain" the famous Nestorian Stele - an ancient Christian monument of Xi'an, in Northwestern China, and sell it to a Western museum. Alerted to his activities (nicknamed by later writers the "Holm-Nestorian expedition to Xi'an"), the local authorities moved the monument from its outdoor location on the western outskirts of the city, and into the Stele Forest museum. In order not to leave China empty-handed, the disappointed Holm had an exact copy of the stele made for him in Xi'an. He had the replica stele taken by cart to the Yellow River, then by small boat down the not very navigable Yellow River to the nearest train station at Zhengzhou, and then by train to the major Yangtze River port of Hankou (now in Wuhan).

Instead of London's British Museum, as he supposedly originally intended, Holm had the replica stele shipped to New York, planning to sell it to the Metropolitan Museum of Art. The museum's director Caspar Purdon Clarke, however, was less than enthusiastic about purchasing "so large a stone ... of no artistic value". Nonetheless, the replica stele was exhibited in the museum "on loan" from Holm for about 10 years.

Eventually, in 1917, Mr. George Leary, a wealthy New Yorker, purchased the replica stele and sent it to Rome, as a gift to the Pope.

On October 9, 1919, Holm married Marguerite MacDonough Green in New York. She was the only child of the late Warren L. Green, the president of the American Bank Note Company.

Holm died in May 1930 from pneumonia.

Notes

References

. Originally published by: Hutchinson & Co, London, 1924.

Danish explorers
Danish sinologists
20th-century Danish philologists
History of Xi'an
Impostors
1880s births
1930 deaths